Eves is a surname. Notable people with the surname include:

 Archie Eves (1876–1858), American football coach
 Ernie Eves (born 1946), Canadian politician
 Howard Eves (1911–2004), American mathematician
 Luke Eves (born 1989), English rugby union player
 Mel Eves (born 1956), English footballer
 Reginald Eves (1876-1941), British painter
 Steve Eves (21st century), American rocket scientist

See also
 Eaves (disambiguation)
Eaves (surname)
 Eve (disambiguation)
Eve (surname)